The 2018 Copa Sevilla was a professional tennis tournament played on clay courts. It was the 21st edition of the tournament which was part of the 2018 ATP Challenger Tour. It took place in Seville, Spain between 3 and 8 September 2018.

Singles main-draw entrants

Seeds

 1 Rankings are as of 27 August 2018.

Other entrants
The following players received wildcards into the singles main draw:
  Javier Barranco Cosano
  Pedro Cachín
  Alejandro Davidovich Fokina
  Nicola Kuhn

The following player received entry into the singles main draw as a special exempt:
  Facundo Argüello

The following players received entry from the qualifying draw:
  Kimmer Coppejans
  Marko Djokovic
  Laurynas Grigelis
  Alex Molčan

Champions

Singles

 Kimmer Coppejans def.  Alex Molčan 7–6(7–2), 6–1.

Doubles

 Gerard Granollers /  Pedro Martínez def.  Daniel Gimeno Traver /  Ricardo Ojeda Lara 6–0, 6–2.

2018
2018 ATP Challenger Tour
2018 in Spanish tennis
September 2018 sports events in Spain